Wang Rong (born 18 April 1984 in Jiangsu) is a Chinese female badminton player and in 2010 she started representing Macau.

Career
In 2000, she won silver medal at the World Junior Championships in girls' singles event. In 2001, she became the runner-up of the Chinese National Badminton Championships in women's singles event. In 2002, she became the runner-up of the French Open tournament in women's singles event. In 2004, she became the women's singles champion of the Chinese National Badminton Championships. In 2009, she became the runner-up of the Thailand Open tournament after defeated by her compatriot Liu Jian.

In 2010, she qualified to representing Macau at the Asian Games. However, in accordance with the competition rules, players must be three years after they last competed for their country of origin before they will be able to represent the country, so her entry qualification was canceled, the Macau team also decided to withdraw from the competition. At the Bitburger Open tournament in Germany, she became the runner-up in women's singles event defeated by Liu Xin of China with the score 21–16, 21–10. She also won the Osaka International tournament beat Kaori Imabeppu of Japan in the longest and closest final of the day in Osaka.

In 2011, she started to play in women's doubles event with Zhang Zhibo, they were competed at the Macau Open Badminton Championships and reached the second round. In 2012, she won the Bitburger Open and became the semi-finalist of the Korea Masters tournaments in women's doubles event partnered with Zhang Zhibo. At the 2012 Bitburger Open Grand Prix Gold she won the title after beat Johanna Goliszewski and Birgit Michels in straight games 21–15, 21–13.

In 2013, she became the semi finalist of the Canadian and Chinese Taipei Open tournaments in women's doubles event with Zhang Zhibo. At the 2013 Canada Open Grand Prix they were defeated by Eefje Muskens and Selena Piek of the Netherlands with the score 21–16, 21–10, and at the Chinese Taipei Grand Prix Gold they were defeated by Lee So-hee and Shin Seung-chan of Korea with the score 21–13, 18–21, 21–16.

References

External links 
 

1984 births
Living people
Badminton players from Jiangsu
Chinese female badminton players
Macau female badminton players
Badminton players at the 2010 Asian Games
Badminton players at the 2014 Asian Games
Asian Games competitors for Macau